René Lennuyeux (1904-1990) was a Général de division of the French Army and Commandant of the French Foreign Legion from 1955 to 1958.

Military career 

Saint-Cyrien of the promotion « du chevalier Bayard » (1923-1925). At his sortie, he opted for the Cavalry.

Sous-lieutenant in 1925 and lieutenant in 1927, he joined the 1st Foreign Cavalry Regiment 1er REC in Morocco (1929-1934) and was cited three times.

Captain in 1936 and Chef d'escadron in 1943, he participated to the disembarking in Provence in 1944 with his regiment as a Chef d'escadron. He took part in the campaigns of France and Germany and was cited twice.

Lieutenant-colonel in 1945, he was designated as the regimental commander of the 2nd Foreign Infantry Regiment 2e REI in Morocco from 1946 to 1949.

Colonel in 1950, he conducted two campaign tours in Indochina 1949–1953.

Général Inspector of the Legion from 1955 to 1958, his command tenure was followed and preceded by général Paul Gardy respectively.

In 1958, he was the director of the civilian and military cabinet of général Raoul Salan in 1958. 
Commandant of the 7th Light Armored Division in 1959, he was also the commandant of the 14th Infantry Division of the northern zone of Algeria in January 1960.

Général de division in 1960, commandant by interim of the Army Corps of Constantine in May 1961, he was also the Inspector of the Armored Cavalry Arm in August 1961. The following year, he was nominated as the deputy to the commandant general of the 1st Military Region from 1962 to 1964.

He was admitted to the second section of officers generals in 1964.

Général René Lennuyeux died in 1990.

Recognitions and Honors 

  Grand Officier de la Légion d'honneur 
 Croix de guerre 1939-1945 
  Croix de guerre des théâtres d'opérations extérieures

He totalized 10 citations.

See also

Major (France)
French Foreign Legion Music Band (MLE)
Jean Olié

References

Sources 
 Répertoire des chefs de corps
 Centre de documentation de la Légion étrangère
 Répertoire des citations (BCAAM)

French military officers
1904 births
1990 deaths